Rune Carlsten (1890–1970) was a Swedish actor, screenwriter and film director.

Biography 
Carlsten studied at Stockholm University 1908–1910, was involved with Einar Fröberg's theater company 1910–1912, at the Swedish Theater in Stockholm 1912–1913, at the Swedish Theater in Helsinki 1913–1914, at the Intimate Theater 1914–1921, at Filmindustri AB Skandia 1918– 1921, at Djurgårdsteatern 1917–1921 and 1924–1925, at Lorensbergsteatern in Gothenburg 1921–1924, at Bonnierfilm 1924, at AB Alb. Ranft's Theater 1925–1926, at the Oscar Theater 1926–1932, at Paramount in Paris 1929–1932, at Finlandia Film (House of Silence) in Helsinki 1933, at Jarfilm in Oslo 1932, at the Comedy Theater 1932–1933, at Ufa in Berlin 1933 and at Rosenbergsatelier in Vienna 1938.

As early as 1919, he made a brilliant role as Carlsson in the first film adaptation of the people of Hemsö.

In 1933 he was engaged at Dramaten where he worked as both an actor and director. Here he staged, among other things, Hjalmar Söderberg's play Aftonstjärnan.

He was involved in the first Swedish experiments with speech film around 1930. Rune Carlsten was affiliated with Radiotjänst from 1930 and was a board member of Drottningholmsteatern's Friends.

In 1942, Carlsten made an acclaimed film adaptation of the recently deceased Hjalmar Söderberg's novel Doktor Glas, in which he appeared as a screenwriter, director and actor.

Rune Carlsten was the son of the wholesaler Eric Carlsten and Hilma Maria Herdin. During the years 1916–1923, he is married to the actress Anna Peréus. From 1925 he was married to the actress Dora Söderberg and the father of the actor and director Rolf Carlsten.

Carlsten is buried at Norra begravningsplatsen in Stockholm.

Selected filmography
 Ett farligt frieri (1919)
 Robinson i skärgården (1920)
 Dangerous Paradise (1931)
 Half Way to Heaven (1931)
 Tired Theodore (1931)
 Longing for the Sea (1931)
 Wife for a Day (1933)
 The Marriage Game (1935)
 Conflict (1937)
 Mot nya tider (1939)
 Frestelse (1940)
 Fransson the Terrible (1941)
Home from Babylon (1941)
 Lasse-Maja (1941)
Doctor Glas (1942)
 General von Döbeln (1942)
 The Sin of Anna Lans (1943)
 Mister Collins' Adventure (1943)
 The Invisible Wall (1944)
 Count Only the Happy Moments (1944)
 Maria of Kvarngarden (1945)
 Black Roses (1945)
 The Serious Game (1945)
 Classmates (1952)
 Salka Valka (1954)

References

Bibliography 
 Waldman, Harry. Missing Reels: Lost Films of American and European Cinema. McFarland, 2000.

External links 
 

Male actors from Stockholm
1890 births
1970 deaths
Swedish film directors
Swedish male stage actors
Swedish male film actors
20th-century Swedish screenwriters
20th-century Swedish male writers